Statistics of the Primera División de México for the 1950–51 season.

Overview

The Segunda División starts in 1950, thus the "Liga Mayor" changed to "Primera Division", every year one team is promoted and one is relegated.

It was contested by 12 teams, and Atlas won the championship.

San Sebastián was relegated to Segunda Division.

Teams

League standings

Results

References
Mexico - List of final tables (RSSSF)

1950-51
Mex
1950–51 in Mexican football